The World Group II was the second highest level of Fed Cup competition in 1997. Winning nations advanced to the World Group Play-offs, and the losing nations were demoted to the World Group II Play-offs.

Croatia vs. Austria

Slovakia vs. Switzerland

South Korea vs. Argentina

South Africa vs. Australia

References

See also
Fed Cup structure

World Group II